Argentine irredentism is the idea of Argentina's sovereignty over the British Overseas Territories of the Falkland Islands, South Georgia and the South Sandwich Islands, along with the dispute with Chile over the Southern Patagonian Ice Field and disputes with both over the region designated as Argentine Antarctica.

Neighbour countries
The territory of modern Argentina was once part of a Spanish viceroyalty, the Viceroyalty of the Río de la Plata, whose administrative capital was in Buenos Aires. The Argentine War of Independence broke the ties to Spain, creating a new independent state, but started as well a process of balkanization, as the administrative dependencies of the viceroyalty had weak links with each other and support to Spanish Monarchy was still strong in Upper Peru, Salta and scattered areas elsewhere. Once the wars of independence and the civil wars ended, the territory of the Spanish viceroyalty was occupied by four independent countries: Argentina, Bolivia, Paraguay and Uruguay. Revisionist historian Vicente Quesada began the territorial nationalism in Argentina, envisioning the territory of the Spanish Viceroyalty as a sort of "Great Argentina", the national limits the country should have had, which fell into Balkanization by a mixture of foreign interventions by Britain and Brazil, the apathy of the Unitarian Party, and poor Argentine diplomacy. This view, disdainful of the neighbour countries, was crafted in the 1880s decade, influenced by the Argentine territorial expansion caused by the Conquest of the desert and by the Great European immigration wave to Argentina.

According to Quesada, Juan Manuel de Rosas and Bartolomé Mitre would have led policies attempting to revert the balkanization, at least partially. However, there is no documented interest of Rosas in the annexation of Bolivia, or just the Tarija province, maintaining the apathy of Bernardino Rivadavia over it. According to the mainstream Uruguayan historiography, the main goal of Rosas during the war with Uruguay was to destroy the economic power of Montevideo, a rival port of Buenos Aires since colonial times. Paraguay stayed neutral in the Argentine Civil Wars during Gaspar Rodríguez de Francia's rule, not allowing even the political asylum of the Unitarians; Rosas stayed in good terms with Paraguay for this. When Carlos Antonio López proclaimed the independence of Paraguay in 1842, Rosas did not take a defined position towards it (he did not accept nor  reject it) but sold weapons to López and did not take any military action against Paraguay, in order to maintain him in a neutral position in the civil wars.

Falkland Islands

Argentina has long claimed the Falkland Islands and the dispute between the United Kingdom and Argentina escalated in 1982 during the Falklands War. It considers the archipelago part of the Tierra del Fuego Province, along with South Georgia and the South Sandwich Islands. The Argentine claim is included in the transitional provisions of the Constitution of Argentina as amended in 1994: 

In June 2009, the Argentine government said it intended to regain sovereignty over the Falkland Islands by peaceful means.

In 2014, Argentina launched a 50 Peso banknote with a map of the Falkland Islands in the white and blue colours of the Argentine flag.

Southern Patagonian Ice Field

 of the Chile–Argentina border, between Mount Fitzroy and Cerro Murallón, remain undefined, on the extrapolar ice field of Southern Patagonia. This desolate uninhabitable region is the last remaining border dispute between Chile and Argentina, outside of Antarctica. On 1 August 1991 the governments of Chile and Argentina had agreed on a borderline, but it was never ratified by the Argentine parliament due to its supposed favoring of Chile. The Argentine Parliament believed the border needed to be pushed farther west to encompass a larger part of the ice field as it provides a large deposit of fresh water, but the Chilean government felt it was already pushed too far west thinning their already thin strip of land in the region. The dispute would come up for demarcation again in 1994, 1998, 2006 and 2009; however no official boundary has ever been reached.

See also
 Dissolution of the Viceroyalty of the Río de la Plata
 Argentine War of Independence

Bibliography

References

External links
 Expedición Transpatagonia 2007, Campo de Hielo Patagónico Sur. Primera exploración histórica del Cordón del Gaviotín y del Lago Greve
 Subsecretario argentino de turismo dice que mapa de Campos de Hielo es oficial  "El Mercurio", Chile  29 August 2006
 Hielos Continentales: reclamo de Chile por los mapas argentinos Clarín, Argentina 29 August 2006
 Tras la fricción por los Hielos Continentales, la Argentina llama a Chile a demarcar los límites "lo antes posible" Clarín, 30 August 1996
 Argentine Bases
 Marambio Base (Spanish/English)
 Dirección Nacional del Antártico: Bases
 Argentine Antarctica History (Spanish)

Argentine nationalism
Irredentism
Politics of the Falkland Islands
Territorial disputes of Argentina
Sovereignty